Ion Albert (2 June 1910 – 1990) was a Romanian gymnast. He competed in eight events at the 1936 Summer Olympics.

References

1910 births
1990 deaths
Romanian male artistic gymnasts
Olympic gymnasts of Romania
Gymnasts at the 1936 Summer Olympics
Sportspeople from Cluj-Napoca